Jazzmun (born February 10, 1969) is the stage name of Jazzmun Nichala Crayton who is an American actress and nightclub performer, often working in the Los Angeles Area.

Background

Originally from San Diego, California, Jazzmun made her first national television appearance on the talent variety show Puttin' on the Hits in 1984, in which she split her body half in male drag and half in female drag, lip synching as a "duet."

Finding work immediately after that appearance for her theatric and modeling talents, she moved to Los Angeles and secured an agent. Since then she has performed all over the world performing as either her stage character "Jazzmun"; her trademark Whitney Houston impersonation, which she performed as in the female stage revue La Cage; or any number of other characters. In the late 1990s Jazzmun co-starred in the stage play Ask Any Girl as the character Mahogany Saint Ross, a name play-on-words to singer Diana Ross.

Latina singer Gloria Estefan hired Jazzmun to perform in the music video of her remake hit "Everlasting Love" after seeing one of Jazzmun's performances. Later, drag icon RuPaul hired Jazzmun to also perform in his music video "A Little Bit of Love" which spoofed drag queens as aliens out to conquer the world. Jazzmun then released two of her own dance singles in 1997 on the Aqua Boogie label: "I'm Gonna Let You Have It" and "That Sound, That Beat." Later she produced another song "2 Tired 2 B Shady," which was later featured in Patrik-Ian Polk's show Noah's Arc.

After many years as a female impersonator, Jazzmun announced (circa 2008) she is a transgender woman. She has stated, "It's not so much as a physical thing but mental and spiritual for me." Jazzmun has played several drag queen and transvestite characters in film and television. Her first role playing a transgender character on television came in 1997 on The Wayans Brothers.

In 2017, Jazzmun participated in a filmed letter to Hollywood written by Jen Richards, produced by GLAAD and ScreenCrush, asking for more and improved roles for transgender people.

Select film resume
 Dreamgirls (2006) - Studio 54 Drag Queen
 Wristcutters (film) A Love Story (2006) - Transvestite
 The 40-Year-Old Virgin (2005) - Prostitute
 Hellbent (2004) - Black Pepper
 Punks (2000) - Chris/Crystal
 Blast from the Past (1999) - Hooker
 The Big Brass Ring (1999) - Little John John

Select television resume
 Big Shots - Dontrelle
 Desperate Housewives - Transgender woman
 CSI: Crime Scene Investigation - Mercedes
 CSI: NY - Bambi
 Nip/Tuck - Transgender Man
 The John Larroquette Show - Pat/Patrick Drag Queen
 The Shield - Frank Gilmore
 Union Square - Drag Queen Doorman
 NYPD Blue - Peaches
 Roseanne - Diana Ross
 ER - Drag Queen
 The Cleaner - Tanya
 The Closer - Nancy 
 The Wayans Bros - Albert/Alberta Transvestite
 Sons of Anarchy - Transgender Drug Dealer
 Gilmore Girls 2nd Season ep. 3 - Janet Jackson
 When We Rise - Bobbi Jean Baker

References

External links

Official Site
Clip of Jazzmun's scene in Puff, Puff, Pass

1969 births
Living people
African-American actresses
African-American musicians
American dance musicians
American house musicians
American film actresses
American television actresses
African-American drag queens
American LGBT musicians
LGBT African Americans
LGBT people from California
American LGBT rights activists
Actresses from San Diego
Transgender actresses
Transgender rights activists
Transfeminists
Feminist musicians
Transgender drag performers
African-American women musicians
21st-century African-American people
21st-century African-American women
20th-century African-American people
20th-century African-American women
American LGBT actors